Vadym Shevchenko (born 12 August 1956) is an association footballer from the former Soviet Union who played for FC Veres Rivne and FC Kryvbas Kryvyi Rih. After retiring as a player, Shevchenko became a football referee.

He was a referee at the 1994 FIFA World Cup qualification match between Faroes and Romania that took place on 8 September 1993 in Toftir, Faroes.

References

External links
 Vadym Shevchenko at the footballfacts.ru
 Vadym Shevchenko at the allplayers.in.ua

1956 births
Living people
Footballers from Baku
Soviet footballers
Ukrainian footballers
Soviet football referees
Ukrainian football referees
NK Veres Rivne players
FC Kryvbas Kryvyi Rih players
FC CSKA Kyiv players
FC Nyva Ternopil players
Association football goalkeepers